Plagiolophus is the scientific name of two genera of organisms and may refer to:

Plagiolophus (plant), a genus of plants in the family Asteraceae
Plagiolophus (mammal), a genus of odd-toed ungulates in the family Pachynolophidae